Alligator Creek is a creek on Eglin Air Force Base near Wright, Florida. It flows out to East Bay River and eventually into East Bay.

References 

Rivers